The historical coat of arms, that served as the symbol of the Sandomierz Land, and the Sandomierz Voivodeship of the Kingdom of Poland, from 14th to 18th centuries, was divided into two fields, with the left field consisting of six stripies, that were alternatining either between red and white, or red and yellow colours, and with the right field consisting of several yellow six-armed stars, which number altered between seven and nine.

The coat of arms was later used as the symbol of the Sandomierz Voivodeship (1816–1837), and the Sandomierz Governorate (1837–1841), of the Congress Poland, and was part of the design of the coat of arms of the Radom Governorate from 1845 to 1866. Currently, the coat of arms is included in the design of the coat of arms of the Świętokrzyskie Voivodeship, and the coat of arms of the Sandomierz County.

History

Kingdom of Poland 

The coat of arms originated as the symbol of the Sandomierz Land, and since 14th century, the symbol of the Sandomierz Voivodeship of the Kingdom of Poland. It consisted of the escutcheon (shield) divided vertically into two halves. The left field consisted of six alternating red and white horizontal stripes, while the left field consisted of yellow (golden) six-armed stars, placed in three rows. The number of stars alternated over time. According to the description of the banner of arms of the Sandomierz Land, used during the Battle of Grunwald in 1410, written by Jan Długosz, the coat of arms had seven stars, distributed into three horizontal rows. Later on, the version with nine stars, distributed in the three rows, each containing three stars. The number of stars might have reflected the number of the counties of the region, which ordinally was seven, and later had risen to eight, and finally nine. The colours of the stripes also varied, with yellow stripes, also being present in various depictions, as opposed to the white stripes. The Sandomierz Voivodeship ceased to exist on 1795

Congress Poland 

The Sandomierz Voivodeship of the Congress Poland had been established in 1816. In 1837, it was replaced by the Sandomierz Governorate. Both of them used the coat of arms reminiscent of the design of the historical coat of arms of the region. It was divided vertically into two halves. The left field consisted of six alternating red and white horizontal stripes, while the left field consisted of nine yellow (golden) six-armed stars, placed in three horizontal rows, each containing three stars.

In 1844 the governorates of Kielce and Sandomierz, were combined together, forming the Radom Governorate. 
The new coat of arms of the administrative region, was the combination of the coats of arms of the two previous regions. It was horizontally divided into two divided horizontally into two halves. The top half consisted of a red background, featuring white (silver) eagle with a yellow (golden) crown on his head that is turned right, a beak, legs, and a stripes on its wings, with the charge being placed on the red background. It was based on the previous coat of arms of the Kielce Governorate. The bottom half was further vertically divided into another two fields. The left field consisted of six alternating red and white horizontal stripes, while the left field consisted of nine yellow (golden) six-armed stars, placed in three rows, each containing three stars. Together, those to field formed a design of the former Sandomierz Governorate. The coat of arms was approved by the viceroy of Poland, Ivan Paskevich, on 5 October 1845, and later, by the tsar or Russia, Nicholas I, on 26 May 1849. It remained in use until 1866.

Second Polish Republic 

In 1928, as part of the project to design the coat of arms for the voivodeships of the Second Polish Republic, the design for the coat of arms of the Kielce Voivodeship had been created. Though planned to be officially approved, it never was implemented, as it was decided to postpone the approval of the subdivision symbols due to the planned administrative reform, that eventually took place in 1938. Eventually, the plans for the establishment of the coat of arms had been stopped by the Invasion of Poland by Nazi Germany, on 1 September 1939, that begun the World War II, and were not picked up back after the end of the conflict.

The proposed design consisted of the Iberian style escutcheon (shield) being divided horizontally into two halves. The top half consisted of a red background, featuring white (silver) eagle with a yellow (golden) crown on his head that is turned right, a beak, legs, and a stripes on its wings, with the charge being placed on the red background. It had the same design as the one used for the proposed coat of arms of the coat of arms of the Kraków Voivodeship, and which was based on a historical design of the coat of arms used by the Kraków Voivodeship of the Kingdom of Poland. The bottom half was further vertically divided into another two fields. The left field consisted of six alternating red and white horizontal stripes, while the left field consisted of nine yellow (golden) six-armed stars, placed in three rows, each containing three stars. Together, those to field formed a historical design of the coat of arms of the Sandomierz Voivodeship. The design of the coat of arms was reminiscent to the one used by the Radom Governorate of Congress Poland, from 1845 to 1869.

Third Polish Republic 

The Kielce Voivodeship of the Third Republic of Poland, had established its coat of arms on 28 October 1997. It consisted of the Iberian style escutcheon, with square top and rounded base, that is divided in the 2 by 2 chessboard pattern. The top left and bottom right fields are blue, while, the top right is white, and the bottom left, consists of eight stripes, that, starting from the top, alternate between red and white colours. The top left field features a yellow patriarchal cross. The top right field features a white eagle with yellow crown, and legs. The bottom left field features nine yellow six-pointed starts, placed in three rows, each with three stars. The yellow patriarchal cross on the blue background refers to the order of the Benedictines at the Łysa Góra mountain, the white eagle on the red background refers to the coat of arms of the Kraków Voivodeship that existed from 14th to 18th centuries, and the bottom fields referred to the coat of arms of the Sandomierz Voivodeship.

The Kielce Voivodeship ceased to exist on 31 December 1998, and most of its territories were incorporated into then-established Świętokrzyskie Voivodeship. The new administrative region reestablished the design as its coat of arms on 11 October 1999, and continued to use it until 18 February 2013, when it had adopted new current version of the coat of arms, in the resolution from 28 December 2012.

The historical design of the coat of arms, is currently used as the symbol of the Sandomierz County, Świętokrzyskie Voivodeship. It consists of the Iberian style escutcheon, with square top and rounded base, that is divided vertically into two fields. The left field consists of six horizontal stripes, alternating between red and white (silver) colours. The right field features nine yellow (golden) six-armed stars, placed in three horizontal rows, each containing three stars. The nine stars are meant to symbolize the nine gminas (municipalities) of the county. The historical coat of arms had also inspired numerous other coats of arms of counties in the region, including the counties of Końskie, Nowy Sącz, Przysucha, Radom, Szydłowiec, and Tarnobrzeg.

See also 
 Coat of arms of the Świętokrzyskie Voivodeship
 Symbols of Sandomierz County

References 

Historical coats of arms of voivodeships of Poland
Sandomierz Voivodeship
History of Lesser Poland
Coats of arms with stars